The Chicagon Mine Road–Chicagon Creek Bridge is a bridge located on Chicagon Mine Road over Chicagon Creek in Bates Township, Michigan. It was listed on the National Register of Historic Places in 1999.

History
The Chicagon Mine Road–Chicagon Creek Bridge was built in 1910, likely for the Iron County Road Commission.  In the era before the standardization of bridge design by the Michigan State Highway Department, this bridge is a notable early example of a concrete slab bridge.  The bridge is still in good condition.

Description
The bridge consists of a single concrete slab supported by concrete abutments with angled concrete wingwalls. The bridge has simple details, with the interior surface of the rails containing recessed panels, with "September 7, 1910" etched in the coping of one guardrail, and "DB" etched in the other.

See also

References

Road bridges on the National Register of Historic Places in Michigan
Bridges completed in 1910
Buildings and structures in Iron County, Michigan
National Register of Historic Places in Iron County, Michigan
Concrete bridges in the United States